Richard Roman (1811 – December 22, 1875) was a politician. Born in Fayette County, Kentucky, after leaving medical school he saw military service in the Black Hawk War in Illinois and later in the Texas Revolution, distinguishing himself at the Battle of San Jacinto. He was a member of the Texas Republic House of Representatives for two terms. He became mayor of Victoria, Texas, in 1844 and in the same year joined the Texas Republic Senate for two years. He went to California during the California Gold Rush of 1849 and would become the first California State Treasurer, 1849–54.

References

External links

See also
 William T. Wallace

State treasurers of California
1811 births
1875 deaths
Mayors of places in Texas
Republic of Texas politicians
1st Congress of the Republic of Texas
People from Fayette County, Kentucky
People from Victoria, Texas
19th-century American politicians